Events from the year 1885 in France.

Incumbents
President: Jules Grévy 
President of the Council of Ministers: Jules Ferry (until 6 April), Henri Brisson (starting 6 April)

Events
 28 February – Siege of Tuyên Quang ends, as French Foreign Legion is relieved after being besieged by forces of the Empire of China.
 23 March – Battle of Bang Bo in Vietnam, significant battle of the Sino-French War and French defeat. Led to the Tonkin Affair, a major political crisis.
 28 March – French abandon Lạng Sơn.
 9 June – Sino-French War ends as treaty is signed.
 14 October – Legislative Election held.
 18 October – Legislative Election hel

Births

January to June
 8 January – Charles Basle, motor racing driver (died 1962)
 22 January – Eugène Christophe, cyclist (died 1970)
 28 January – Maurice Brocco, cyclist (died 1965)
 1 February – Camille Chautemps, politician and three times Prime Minister of France (died 1963)
 6 March – Yvonne Gall, operatic soprano (died 1972)
 16 March – Fernand Baldet, astronomer (died 1964)
 23 March – Yves le Prieur, naval officer and inventor (died 1963)
 6 April – Jules Goux, motor racing driver (died 1965)
 5 June – Georges Mandel, politician and Resistance leader (executed) (died 1944)
 15 June – Roland Dorgelès, novelist (died 1973)
 27 June – Pierre Montet, Egyptologist (died 1966)

July to December
 5 July – André Lhote, sculptor and painter (died 1962)
 26 July – André Maurois, author and man of letters (died 1967)
 26 August – Jules Romains, poet and writer (died 1972)
 31 August – Lucien Chopard, entomologist (died 1971)
 15 September – Marcel Allain, writer (died 1970)
 11 October – François Mauriac, author, winner of the Nobel Prize in Literature (died 1970)
 25 October – Xavier Lesage, horse rider and Olympic gold medallist (died 1969)
 10 November – Lou Albert-Lasard, painter (died 1969)
 23 December – Pierre Brissaud, illustrator, painter and engraver (died 1964)

Full date unknown
 Camille Arambourg, paleontologist (died 1970)

Deaths
 10 January – Amable Tastu, woman of letters (born 1795).
 16 January – Edmond François Valentin About, novelist, publicist and journalist (born 1828)
 18 April – Marc Monnier, writer (born 1827)
 3 May – Paul-Quentin Desains, physicist (born 1817)
 18 May – Alphonse-Marie-Adolphe de Neuville, painter (born 1835)
 22 May – Victor Hugo, poet, playwright, novelist and statesman (born 1802)
 June – Amédée Courbet, admiral (born 1828)
 29 July – Henri Milne-Edwards, zoologist (born 1800)
 17 December – Augustus Thébaud, Jesuit educator and publicist (born 1807)
 24 December – Louis Prosper Gachard, man of letters (born 1800)

References

1880s in France